In mathematics, the tanc function is defined for  as

Properties 
The first-order derivative of the tanc function is given by

The Taylor series expansion iswhich leads to the series expansion of the integral asThe Padé approximant is

In terms of other special functions 
 , where  is Kummer's confluent hypergeometric function.
, where  is the biconfluent Heun function.
 , where  is a Whittaker function.

Gallery

See also

 Sinhc function
 Tanhc function
 Coshc function

References

Special functions